Mask in Blue may refer to:

Mask in Blue (original title Maske in Blau), 1937 German operetta
Mask in Blue (1943 film), German film version directed by Paul Martin
Mask in Blue (1953 film), German film version directed by Georg Jacoby

See also
The Blue Mask (disambiguation)